Metarctia fario is a moth of the subfamily Arctiinae. It was described by Sergius G. Kiriakoff in 1957. It is found in the Democratic Republic of the Congo.

References

 

Metarctia
Moths described in 1957
Endemic fauna of the Democratic Republic of the Congo